The Gimcheon Open ATP Challenger (formerly known as Adidas International Gimcheon due to sponsorship reasons) is a tennis tournament held in Gimcheon, South Korea since 2014. The event is part of the ATP Challenger Tour and is played on outdoor hard courts.

Past finals

Singles

Doubles

References
ITF Website

 
ATP Challenger Tour
Hard court tennis tournaments
Tennis tournaments in South Korea